Jason Francis Johnson (born 8 December 1967) is a radio presenter from Canada who had co-presented the breakfast show on Kiss 92FM in Singapore together with Maddy Barber and Divian Nair. He was previously a movie and music reviewer for the Singapore newspaper The New Paper.

Biography 
Johnson grew up in Lethbridge, Alberta, Canada, before moving to Singapore in 1995.

Since Kiss 92FM opened in August 2012, Johnson has been the co-host of the station's breakfast show, 'Maddy & Jason', from 6.00 - 10.00 am on weekdays together with Maddy Barber.

Prior to joining Kiss 92FM, Johnson used to appear weekly on the radio station Hot FM 91.3's evening drive-time show, 'The Backseat', on Thursdays talking about movies. He was also a movie and music columnist for The New Paper for several years.

Johnson left Kiss 92FM in late August 2020 to pursue personal interests.

Personal life 
Johnson is married to a Singaporean and has two sons.

References

1967 births
Living people
Canadian radio hosts